Medicon Valley is a leading international life-sciences cluster in Europe, spanning the Greater Copenhagen region of eastern Denmark and southern Sweden. It is one of Europe's strongest life science clusters, with many life science companies and research institutions located within a relatively small geographical area. The name has officially been in use since 1997.

Major life science sectors of the Medicon Valley cluster includes pharmacology, biotechnology, health tech and medical technology. It is specifically known for its research strengths in the areas of neurological disorders, inflammatory diseases, cancer and diabetes.

Background and activities 
The population of Medicon Valley reaches close to 4 million inhabitants. In 2008, 60% of Scandinavian pharmaceutical companies were located in the region. The area includes 17 universities, 32 hospitals, and more than 400 life science companies. 20 are large pharmaceutical or medical technology firms and 170 are dedicated biotechnology firms. Between 1998 and 2008, 100  new  biotechnology  and  medical  technology  companies  were  created here. The biotechnology industry alone employs around 41,000 people in the region, 7,000 of whom are academic researchers.

International companies with major research centres in the region include Novo Nordisk, Baxter, Lundbeck, LEO Pharma, HemoCue and Ferring Pharmaceuticals. There are more than 7 science parks in the region, all with a significant focus on life science, including the Medicon Village in Lund, established in 2010. Companies within Medicon Valley account for more than 20% of the total GDP of Denmark and Sweden combined.

Medicon Valley is promoted by Invest in Skåne and Copenhagen Capacity.

Many of the region's universities have a strong heritage in biological and medical research and have produced several Nobel Prize winners. The almost century-long presence of a number of research-intensive and fully integrated pharmaceutical companies, such as Novo Nordisk, H. Lundbeck and LEO Pharma, has also contributed significantly to the medical research and business development of the region by strengthening abilities within applied research, attracting suppliers and producing spin-offs.

In 2011, the organisations of MVA and Invest in Skåne, launched the concept of Beacons. Beacons are projects for creating world-leading cross-disciplinary research environments with a focus on areas where there are considerable potential for synergies in Medicon Valley specifically. After a long thorough selection process, the four Beacons of systems biology, structural biology, immune regulation and drug delivery were approved.

The Medicon Valley issues the quaternal life science magazine "Medicon Valley".

Science parks 
Science parks in Medicon Valley includes:

 Copenhagen Bio Science Park (COBIS)
 Ideon Science Park (largest of its kind in Scandinavia)
Symbion
 Krinova Science Park
 Medicon Village
 Medeon Science Park
 Scion DTU

References

Sources and further reading 
 
 
  A case study.

External links
 Medicon Valley Swedish-Danish life-sciences cluster
 Medicon Valley Alliance
 Invest in Skåne Swedish business organisation
 Copenhagen Capacity Danish business organisation

Biotechnology
High-technology business districts
Science and technology in Denmark
Science and technology in Sweden
Venture capital